The women's hammer throw competition at the 2018 Asian Games took place on 25 August 2018 at the Gelora Bung Karno Stadium.

Schedule
All times are Western Indonesia Time (UTC+07:00)

Records

Results

References

External links
Results

Women's hammer throw
2018 Women